In the late 1950s, Disney contracted with the Stratemeyer Syndicate and Grosset & Dunlap to produce two Hardy Boys TV serials, starring Tim Considine and Tommy Kirk. The first of the serials, The Mystery of the Applegate Treasure, was aired on The Mickey Mouse Club in 1956 during the show's second season. To appeal to the show's audience, the Hardy Boys were portrayed as younger than in the books, seeming to be twelve or thirteen years old (Considine was 15 and Kirk was 14 during filming). The script, written by Jackson Gillis, was based on the first Hardy Boys book, The Tower Treasure, and the serial was aired in 19 episodes of fifteen minutes each with production costs of $5,700. A second serial, The Mystery of Ghost Farm, followed in 1957, with an original story by Jackson Gillis. However, for unknown reasons, no more serials were produced.

Series 1 cast
 Tim Considine – Frank Hardy
 Tommy Kirk – Joe Hardy
 Florenz Ames – Silas Applegate
 Russ Conway – Fenton Hardy
 Sarah Selby – Aunt Gertrude
 Carole Ann Campbell – Iola Martin

Series 1 Episodes	       	 	       	 
      An Introduction	       	Oct 1, 1956	       	 
 1.   A Stranger	       	Oct 2, 1956	       	 
 2.   A Real Case	       	Oct 3, 1956	       	 
 3.   The First Clue	       	Oct 4, 1956	       	 
 4.   The Fugitive	       	Oct 5, 1956	       	 
 5.   Applegate's Gold	       	Oct 8, 1956	       	 
 6.   Dig For Treasure	       	Oct 9, 1956	       	 
 7.   A Pirate's Chest	       	Oct 10, 1956	       	 
 8.   Boys in Trouble	       	Oct 11, 1956	       	 
 9.   Female Detective	       	Oct 12, 1956	       	 
 10. Iola's Bravery	       	Oct 15, 1956	       	 
 11. Footsteps in the Tower	Oct 16, 1956	       	 
 12. The Prisoner Speaks	Oct 17, 1956	       	 
 13. The Strange Confession	Oct 18, 1956	       	 
 14. A Golden Clue	       	Oct 19, 1956	       	 
 15. The Final Search	       	Oct 22, 1956	       	 
 16. The Tower's Secret       	Oct 23, 1956	       	 
 17. Never Say Die	       	Oct 24, 1956	       	 
 18. Boys in Danger	       	Oct 25, 1956	       	 
 19. The Tower Treasure	Oct 26, 1956

Series 2 cast
 Tim Considine – Frank Hardy
 Tommy Kirk – Joe Hardy
 Russ Conway – Fenton Hardy
 Sarah Selby – Aunt Gertrude
 Carole Ann Campbell – Iola Martin

Opening credits
The theme song was performed by Thurl Ravenscroft and played over clips from Disney's  Treasure Island.

Home media
In December 2006, the Disney studio issued a Treasures DVD for The Hardy Boys: Mystery of the Applegate Treasure.

References

Sources
 
 

1956 American television series debuts
1956 American television series endings
1950s American children's television series
The Hardy Boys
The Mickey Mouse Club serials